The Men's skeet eventtook place on 25 and 26 July 2014 at the Barry Buddon Shooting Centre. There was a qualification event to determine the final participants.

Results

Qualification

Semi-finals

Finals

References

External links
Schedule of events at 2014 Commonwealth games-Glasgow 

Shooting at the 2014 Commonwealth Games